Atlantis Marine Park is an abandoned theme park built in 1981 in Two Rocks, a small fishing community  north of Perth, the capital of Western Australia. The park was a major feature of Alan Bond's Yanchep Sun City plan. It closed in August 1990 due to financial difficulty.

History 
In the 1970s Bond purchased 20,000 acres of land in Yanchep with a plan to build a large resort and residential area. The Park was constructed in 1981 with the hope that Perth's rapid expansion would be accompanied by an equal growth in tourism. Six months before the park was opened, seven bottlenose dolphins were caught locally and trained as performance animals for the next ten years. The park was opened by the Premier of Western Australia the Hon. Ray O'Connor and the chairman and president of the Tokyu Corporation Mr Noburu Gotoh. In his opening speech Mr Gotoh explained that Atlantis was the first element in an expansion plan to make the Yanchep Sun City a premier leisure recreation region. 

In 1988, three female dolphin calves were born, which as a result of changes in regulations for holding marine mammals meant Atlantis would have to construct a larger dolphin enclosure. This, coupled with the park gradually losing money, was the reason for the owners closing Atlantis in August 1990.

Dolphins 
Prior to the park's opening, seven bottlenose dolphins were caught from the local coastal population and were used as performance animals for the next ten years. At the time Atlantis closed in 1990, the park had nine dolphins, six wild born, and three captive born juveniles.

With the closure of the park, the owners Tokyu Corporation of Japan agreed to a proposal by Dr. Nick Gales, a marine park veterinarian and research scientist to fully fund the release of the animals to the wild, provided it would end their financial commitment to the dolphins. The project to release the animals into the wild began in March 1991; the rehabilitation program began in the park pools and eventually moved to a sea pen at the Two Rocks Marina in October 1991. The dolphins were fully released into the wild in January 1992.

The initial release encountered problems, with some of the dolphins losing a lot of weight. Three of them were recaptured and returned to the sea pen. The three recaptured dolphins were not re-released to the wild, but were relocated to Underwater World, now the Aquarium of Western Australia.

Current situation 

Since its closure in 1990 the park has been abandoned and vandalised, though the site was featured in the CBBC programme All Over the Place – Australia in March 2014. The site is currently owned by property developers, the Fini Group. A plan has been put forward to the City of Wanneroo to develop the area into a mix of retail, commercial and entertainment land uses.

A large limestone sculpture of King Neptune by American sculptor Mark Le Buse that originally overlooked the park remains a major landmark in the suburb and is often factored in any future redevelopment plans. The sculpture, which had sat abandoned and fenced off since the park's closure in 1990, was heritage listed by the Western Australian Heritage Council in 2006, before being restored and the surrounding area reopened to the public in May 2015.

In January 2023, the Sun City precinct, which encompasses the former site of Atlantis Marine Park and the King Neptune sculpture, as well as Two Rocks marina and shopping centre, was added to the State Register of Heritage Places in recognition of Sun City's place as the state's first private residential, commercial and recreational investment project.

References

External links 
 

1981 establishments in Australia
1990 disestablishments in Australia
Amusement parks in Western Australia
Defunct amusement parks in Australia
Modern ruins
State Register of Heritage Places in the City of Wanneroo